Guajaibona is a genus of land snails with an operculum, terrestrial gastropod mollusks in the family Pomatiidae.

Species 
Species within the genus Guajaibona include:
Guajaibona petrei (d’Orbigny, 1842)

References 

Pomatiidae